Géza Anda (19 November 192113 June 1976) was a Swiss-Hungarian pianist. A celebrated interpreter of classical and romantic repertoire, particularly noted for his performances and recordings of Mozart, he was also considered to be a tremendous interpreter of Beethoven, Schumann, Brahms and Bartók.
In his heyday he was regarded as an amazing artist, possessed of a beautiful, natural and flawless technique that gave his concerts a unique quality.  Most of his recordings were made on the Deutsche Grammophon label.

Biography

Early years
Géza Anda was born in 1921 in Budapest. He studied with Imre Stefaniai and Imre Keéri-Szántó, then became a pupil of Ernst von Dohnányi and Zoltán Kodály at the Franz Liszt Academy in Budapest.  In 1940 he won the Liszt Prize, and in the next year, he made an international name for himself with his performance of Brahms's Piano Concerto No. 2. In 1941, he also made his debut with the Berlin Philharmonic under Wilhelm Furtwängler, who dubbed him "troubadour of the piano." In 1943, he settled in Switzerland. He was married to Hortense Bührle, daughter of Emil Georg Bührle (owner Schweiz. Werkzeugmaschinenfabrik and art collector), Zürich.

Later years
In the mid-1950s, Anda gave masterclasses at the Salzburg Mozarteum, and in 1960 he took the position of director of the Lucerne masterclasses, succeeding Edwin Fischer. His students included Per Enflo, who later became renowned for his work in mathematical analysis.

As a performer, Anda was particularly noted for his interpretation of Schumann's and Brahms's piano music. The New Grove Dictionary cites his "charismatic readings of Bartók and Schumann". He was regarded as the principal Bartók interpreter of his generation, even if other pianists since his death have made more obviously exciting recordings of that composer's concertos.  Although he played very little Mozart in his early career, he became the first pianist to record the full cycle of Mozart's piano concerti; he recorded them between 1961 and 1969, conducting the orchestra from the keyboard.

His performance of the Andante from Mozart's Piano Concerto No. 21 in C on the soundtrack of the 1967 film Elvira Madigan led to the epithet "Elvira Madigan" often being applied to the concerto.

"From the outset of his career, he was what one might call a philosopher-virtuoso.  In his lifelong quest for the perfect balance of head and heart, between intellect and instinct, he explored many facets of music-making."  He was honored in 1965 by being named a Chevalier of the Ordre des Arts et des Lettres, and he also became an honorary member of the Royal Academy of Music in 1970.

During his career he collaborated with other directors, among which are worth highlighting Ferenc Fricsay where he joined the Berlin Radio Symphony,  Claudio Abbado, Ernest Ansermet, Sir John Barbirolli, Karl Böhm, Ernest Bour, Eugen Jochum, Herbert von Karajan, Joseph Keilberth, István Kertész, Otto Klemperer, Rafael Kubelík, Ferdinand Leitner, Erich Leinsdorf, Fritz Reiner, Hans Rosbaud, Sir Malcolm Sargent, Carl Schuricht, Sir Georg Solti and George Szell.

He died on 14 June 1976 in Zurich, Switzerland. His cause of death was esophageal cancer.

See also
 Concours Géza Anda
 Great Pianists of the 20th Century – Géza Anda

Notes

References

External links

 
 Official Homepage of Concours Géza Anda, Zürich
 Discography and bibliography

1921 births
1976 deaths
Hungarian musicians
Hungarian conductors (music)
Male conductors (music)
Hungarian classical pianists
Male classical pianists
Deutsche Grammophon artists
Franz Liszt Academy of Music alumni
Honorary Members of the Royal Academy of Music
Deaths from cancer in Switzerland
Chevaliers of the Ordre des Arts et des Lettres
Pupils of Ernő Dohnányi
20th-century conductors (music)
20th-century classical pianists
20th-century composers
Deaths from esophageal cancer
20th-century Hungarian male musicians
Hungarian emigrants to Switzerland